This list of University of Pittsburgh faculty includes instructors, researchers, and administrators of the University of Pittsburgh, a state-related research university located in Pittsburgh, Pennsylvania, United States.

Arts and entertainment 

Geri Allen (A&S 1983G, faculty 2013–2017) – jazz composer, educator, and pianist
F. Curtis Canfield (faculty 1967–73) – theater director and drama professor
Caitlin Clarke – theater and film actress; theatre teacher
David Dalessandro (administrator) – screenwriter of 2006 thriller Snakes on a Plane
Nathan Davis (faculty 1969–2013) – jazz musician
Terrance Hayes (MFA 1997, faculty 2013–present) – poet whose books have won such awards as the National Book Award for Poetry and the National Poetry Series
Chuck Kinder (faculty 1980–2014) – is an American novelist. 
Carl Kurlander (faculty) – Hollywood screenwriter, television writer/producer, and author
Jeanne Marie Laskas (MFA 1986, faculty 2001–present) – journalist/writer, author of Concussion, GQ correspondent
Nicole Mitchell (faculty 2019–present) – American jazz flautist and composer
Joe Negri (faculty) – jazz guitarist and educator
Ed Ochester – professor, poet, and editor
Rob Penny – professor, poet, and playwright
Christopher Rawson (faculty) – writer and theater critic
Ed Roberson (A&S 1970, faculty) – poet
Rebecca Skloot (MFA, faculty) – freelance science writer; best selling author; specializes in science and medicine
Terry Smith – art historian, art critic, and artist
Jack Stauber – YouTuber, musician, singer-songwriter, designer, and animator
Franklin Toker (faculty) – architectural historian and author

Business and economics

 Alvin E. Roth (faculty 1982–1998) – Nobel Prize-winning economist; Andrew W. Mellon Professor of Economics 
Jagdish Sheth (Katz 1962, 1966; faculty 1973–1974) – business consultant; Albert Frey Professor of Marketing

History
Barbara Stern Burstin (faculty) – Holocaust scholar and author
Paul Russell Cutright (PhD, faculty) – American historian and biologist
Robert Donnorummo – Senior Research Associate and Associate Director of the Center for Russian and East European Studies
Seymour Drescher (faculty) – historian known for his work on Alexis de Tocqueville and slavery
Hugh Kearney (faculty) – British historian
Irina Livezeanu (faculty) – historian of Eastern Europe and the Holocaust
Patrick Manning (faculty) – specialist in world and African history, including migration and the African diaspora
David Montgomery (former faculty) – historian specializing in U.S. labor history
Diego Olstein (PhD, faculty) - current chair of the history department (as of March 2023), also known for his work on Medieval Europe and world history
Marcus Rediker (faculty) – George Washington Book Prize and Merle Curti Award-winning historian

History and Philosophy of Science
Michael R. Dietrich (PhD 1991, faculty) – Professor, History and Philosophy of Biology
John Earman – (Emeritus Distinguished Professor) – Philosopher of Physics, collaborator on the hole argument
James G. Lennox – (Emeritus Professor) – History and Philosophy of Biology
Edouard Machery (PhD 2004, faculty) – Distinguished Professor, History and Philosophy of Psychology
Stephen Manuck - Distinguished Professor of Psychology
Sandra Mitchell (PhD 1987, faculty) – Distinguished Professor, History and Philosophy of Biology
John D. Norton (PhD 1981, faculty) – Distinguished Professor, History and Philosophy of Physics
Robert Olby – (Emeritus Professor) – History of Biology

Philosophy

Nuel Belnap – logician and philosopher known for his work on the philosophy of logic, temporal logic and structural proof theory
Robert Brandom (faculty) – philosopher ("the Iron City Kant") and author of Making it Explicit
James F. Conant – philosopher who has written about the philosophy of language, ethics, and metaphilosophy; known for writings on Wittgenstein and his association with the New Wittgenstein interpretation
David Gauthier – Canadian-American neo-Hobbesian philosopher; author of Morals By Agreement; philosophy department chairman
Adolf Grünbaum – professor and philosopher of science elected into the American Academy of Arts and Sciences
John Haugeland – professor and philosopher whose work has focused on the philosophy of mind, cognitive science, phenomenology, and Heidegger; coined the term "Good Old Fashioned Artificial Intelligence"
Carl G. Hempel – University Professor of Philosophy and notable proponent of logical positivism
John McDowell – philosopher, author of Mind and World
Nicholas Rescher – professor and philosopher; advocate of pragmatism and process philosophy; namesake of the Rescher Prize in Philosophy
Wilfrid Sellars – philosopher and critic of foundationalist epistemology whose work is the foundation and archetype of what is sometimes called the "Pittsburgh School"
Rudolph H. Weingartner – philosopher and former provost of the university (1987–1989), Guggenheim Fellow

Politics, law, and activism

Ruggero J. Aldisert – Judge on the United States Court of Appeals for the Third Circuit; adjunct professor at University of Pittsburgh School of Law
D. Michael Fisher (Law) – Senior United States federal judge of the United States Court of Appeals for the Third Circuit. 
David Garrow (Law, 2011–present) – law professor and historian who won the 1987 Pulitzer Prize for Biography; writes about the history of the United States Supreme Court and the history of the Civil Rights Movement
Eugene Allen Gilmore (Law 1940–1942) – Vice Governor-General of the Philippine Islands from 1922 to 1929 who twice served as acting Governor-General of the Philippines 
Paul Y. Hammond (Graduate School of Public and International Affairs) – Distinguished Service Professor, specialist in American foreign policy and national security studies 
Carla Hayden – American librarian and the 14th Librarian of Congress. She is the first woman and the first African-American to hold the post.
David J. Hickton (Law 1981) – staff director and senior counsel to the House Select Subcommittee on the Coronavirus Crisis, former U.S. Attorney for the Western District of Pennsylvania, director and founder of the University of Pittsburgh Institute for Cyber Law, Policy and Security
Christopher Hitchens – Deceased author, journalist, and polemicist; had taught several semesters at Pitt as a visiting professor.
Walter H. Lowrie (Col 1826, faculty 1846–1851) – chief justice of the Pennsylvania Supreme Court
J. Warren Madden (Law faculty) – served on the US Court of Claims; first Chair of the National Labor Relations Board; received the Medal of Freedom in 1947
Raymond Tshibanda (faculty) – President of the Liberal Christian Democrats Union of the Democratic Republic of the Congo

Science, medicine, and technology

George Frederick Barker (faculty 1864–?) – scientist who studied early incandescent lighting; president of the American Association for the Advancement of Science and American Chemical Society
Jeremy M. Berg (faculty) – Eli Lilly Award in Biological Chemistry-winning biochemist known for his work on zinc finger proteins
John Alfred Brashear – astronomer; succeeded James Keeler as Director of the Allegheny Observatory; later Pitt's Chancellor; maker of astronomical and scientific instruments; developer of silvering methods that would become the standard for telescope mirrors
David M. Brienza (faculty) – bioengineer specializing in wheelchair design and ulcer prevention
William A. Cassidy – geologist noted for his work on Antarctic meteorites, founder and former leader of ANSMET. 
Yuan Chang – virologist; pathologist; co-discoverer of the cause of Kaposi's sarcoma, a deadly cancer commonly found in AIDS patients
David I. Cleland (A&S 1954, KGSB 1958, faculty) – engineer and educator; "father of project management"
Ellen Cohn – associate dean at the University of Pittsburgh School of Health and Rehabilitation Sciences
Rory A. Cooper (faculty 1994–present) – bioengineer and inventor who holds numerous patents on wheelchair technology.
Sheila Corrall (faculty) – Professor of Library and Information Science and first President of the Chartered Institute of Library and Information Professionals (CILIP).
John Charles Cutler (faculty) – former deputy director of the Pan American Sanitary Bureau; led a U.S. Public Health Service research team in a controversial experiment which infected about 1500 citizens of Guatemala with syphilis and gonorrhea in the late 1940s
Thomas Detre (faculty) – psychiatrist; transformative leader within the University of Pittsburgh Medical Center, 1973–2010
Erik Erikson (faculty 1951–1960) – developmental psychologist and psychoanalyst known for his theory on psychosocial development and for coining the phrase "identity crisis" 
Kai T. Erikson (faculty 1959–1963) – sociologist; authority on the social consequences of catastrophic events; 76th president of the American Sociological Association
Reginald Aubrey Fessenden – inventor, chemist, and sonar pioneer; developed insulation for electrical wires; built first wireless telephone; transmitted the first audio radio broadcast; head of electrical engineering at Western University of Pennsylvania
Bernard Fisher (MD, faculty)– pioneer breast cancer researcher
 Ida M. Flynn (1942–2004) – American computer scientist, textbook author, and professor
Diana E. Forsythe – anthropologist noted for her work on artificial intelligence and medical informatics
Freddie Fu (faculty) – sports medicine expert
David Geller (faculty) – hepatobiliary surgical oncologist who helped to pioneer laparoscopic liver resections
George Otto Gey (A&S 1921, faculty) – scientist who first propagated the HeLa cell line
Thomas Hales – mathematics professor; provided proof of the Kepler Conjecture

David Halliday (A&S 1938, MS 1939, PhD 1941, faculty 1946–2010) — physicist widely known for his physics textbooks, Physics and Fundamentals of Physics
D.A. Henderson (faculty) – 1986 National Medal of Science; directed World Health Organization's Global Smallpox Eradication Campaign
 Niels Kaj Jerne (faculty 1962–1966) – Nobel Prize-winning immunologist credited for describing the production of monoclonal antibodies
Panayotis Katsoyannis – biochemist; discoverer of synthetic insulin
James E. Keeler – astronomer; Director of Allegheny Observatory, 1891–1898; discovered that Saturn's rings were not solid but made of particles; interred in the observatory crypt
Allen Kent – (faculty 1963–1992) pioneer of information science, founded Pitt's Department of Information Science
Charles Glen King (MS, PhD, faculty) – biochemist; isolated vitamin C
Samuel Pierpont Langley – astronomer, physicist, inventor, aviation pioneer, professor of astronomy at the Western University of Pennsylvania; his 1890 publication of infrared observations at the Allegheny Observatory was used to make the first calculations on the greenhouse effect
Margaret McFarland – an American child psychologist who researched the meaning of the interactions between mothers and children.
Maud Menten – pathologist at Pitt, 1923–1950; helped devise the Michaelis–Menten equation in the field of enzyme kinetics
Patrick S. Moore – virologist and epidemiologist; co-discoverer of the cause of Kaposi's sarcoma, a deadly cancer commonly found in AIDS patients
Herbert Needleman – a pediatrician and child psychiatrist known for research studies on the neurodevelopmental damage caused by lead poisoning
Eugene Nicholas Myers – leader in the treatment of head and neck cancer
Ezra T. Newman (faculty) – physicist known for Newman-Penrose formalism, Kerr-Newman solution, Heaven, and null foliation theory
Jack Paradise (faculty) – pediatrician; a leading researcher of the placement of tympanostomy tubes in children with persistent otitis media
Thomas Parran, Jr. – physician; first Dean of the University of Pittsburgh School of Public Health after serving as U.S. Surgeon General, 1936–1948
Mark M. Ravitch (faculty 1969–1989) – professor of surgery
Robert Resnick – (1940–1956) – physicist widely known for his physics textbook Fundamentals of Physics written with David Halliday
Renã A. S. Robinson – researcher into ion-mobility spectrometry and time-of-flight mass spectrometry, proteomics, Alzheimer's disease
Carlo Rovelli – (1990–2000, affiliated 2000-present) – theoretical physicist in the field of quantum gravity where he is among the founders of the loop quantum gravity theory. He has also worked in the history and philosophy of science for which he maintains a status of Affiliated Professor in the university's Department of History and Philosophy of Science.
Peter Safar – physician, CPR pioneer; three-time nominee for the Nobel Prize; established Pitt's Anesthesiology Department
José-Alain Sahel – ophthalmologist and leading vision researcher who founded the Vision Institute in Paris
Jonas Salk – physician, head of Pitt Virus Research Lab, developer of the polio vaccine
Jeffrey H. Schwartz – anthropologist; elected President of the World Academy of Art and Science
David Servan-Schreiber – physician, neuroscientist, and New York Times best-selling author.
Benjamin Spock – writer of child development books
Thomas Starzl – transplant pioneer, 2004 National Medal of Science recipient
Ernest J. Sternglass – physicist and author, known for his research on the health risks of low-level radiation and digital medical imaging technologies
William E. Wallace (PhD Chem 1941 & faculty) – physical chemist and Guggenheim Fellow who worked on the Manhattan Project
Cyril Wecht (A&S 1952, Med 1956, LLB 1962, faculty) – controversial forensic pathologist
J. Scott Yaruss (faculty) – American Speech-Language-Hearing Association fellow; stuttering researcher

Other

Thyrsa Amos (faculty 1919–1941) – Dean of Women and Professor of Education; founder and first President of the Pennsylvania Association of Deans of Women; founder of the Lambda Sigma; President of the National Association of Deans of Women (NADW)
Kathleen M. Blee (faculty) – gender and race sociologist
Kathleen Musante DeWalt – director of the Center for Latin American Studies – University of Pittsburgh
Joseph W. Eaton (faculty 1959–2012) – sociologist who published widely in the fields of social work, sociology, public health, and public and international affairs
Daniel Everett (1988–1999) – linguist
John Henry Hopkins (faculty 1820s) – eighth Presiding Bishop of the US Episcopal Church
Michael Lovell (ENGR 1989, '91, '94, ENGR faculty) – former chancellor of University of Wisconsin-Milwaukee; President of Marquette University
Johnny Majors – Head Football Coach at the University of Pittsburgh 1973-76 and 1993–96; National Championship in 1976
John Markoff (faculty) – historical democratization sociologist
Fred Rogers (faculty SIS) – creator and host of Mister Rogers' Neighborhood
Jock Sutherland (A&S, faculty) – Hall of Fame football coach; All-American Football player; Pitt Professor of Dentistry
Glenn Scobey Warner – "Pop" Warner; Head Football Coach at the University of Pittsburgh, 1915–1923; coached his teams to 33 straight major wins and three national championships (1915, 1916 and 1918)

See also

List of University of Pittsburgh alumni

References

Lists of people by university or college in Pennsylvania
Pittsburgh-related lists